Anita Johansson may refer to:

 Anita Johansson (politician) (born 1944), Swedish social democratic politician
 Anita Johansson (figure skater) (born 1954), former Swedish figure skater